Gonioprocris is a genus of moths of the family Zygaenidae.

Species
The genus includes the following species:

 Gonioprocris megalops (Druce, 1884)
 Gonioprocris xena Jordan, 1913

References
 Gonioprocris at Markku Savela's Lepidoptera and Some Other Life Forms

Procridinae
Zygaenidae genera